The Steak is a Canadian documentary film, directed by Pierre Falardeau and Manon Leriche and released in 1992. The film is a portrait of former Canadian boxing champion Gaétan Hart, profiling both the ups and downs of his career in the 1970s and 1980s and his attempt to return to the sport in a 1990 fight.

The film's title was inspired by "A Piece of Steak", Jack London's 1909 short story about a retired boxer struggling with poverty.

The film received a Genie Award nomination for Best Feature Length Documentary at the 13th Genie Awards.

References

External links
 

1992 films
1992 documentary films
Canadian sports documentary films
Canadian boxing films
National Film Board of Canada documentaries
Quebec films
Documentary films about boxing
Films directed by Pierre Falardeau
French-language Canadian films
1990s Canadian films